Bieżanów-Prokocim is one of 18 districts of Kraków, located in the southeast part of the city. The name Bieżanów-Prokocim comes from two villages that are now parts of the district.

Subdivisions of Bieżanów-Prokocim
Bieżanów-Prokocim is divided into smaller subdivisions (osiedles). Here's a list of them.
 Bieżanów
 Bieżanów Kolonia
 Kaim
 Łazy
 Osiedle Kolejowe
 Osiedle Medyków
 Osiedle Na Kozłówce
 Osiedle Nad Potokiem
 Osiedle Nowy Bieżanów
 Osiedle Nowy Prokocim
 Osiedle Parkowe
 Osiedle Złocień
 Prokocim
 Rżąka

Population

References

External links
 Official website of Bieżanów-Prokocim
 Biuletyn Informacji Publicznej

Districts of Kraków